Torey Hayward Hunter (born February 10, 1972) is a former American football defensive back. He played for the Houston Oilers in 1995.

References

1972 births
Living people
American football defensive backs
Washington State Cougars football players
Houston Oilers players